The 2004 NCAA Division I baseball tournament was held from June 4 through June 27, . Sixty-four NCAA Division I college baseball teams met after having played their way through a regular season, and for some, a conference tournament, to play in the NCAA tournament.  The tournament culminates with 8 teams in the College World Series at historic Rosenblatt Stadium in Omaha, Nebraska.

In the 58th College World Series and the 55th series held in Omaha, the Cal State Fullerton Titans rode the arm of Jason Windsor, named the Series' Most Outstanding Player, to prevail over the field and claim the 2004 National Championship. The Titans won Bracket II with a 3–1 record and went on to sweep Bracket I winner Texas in two games to claim the title. Windsor picked up two complete game victories and a save, and threw more than 300 pitches in the series. Ricky Romero also recorded two wins for the Titans.

Bids

Automatic bids
Conference champions from 30 Division I conferences earned automatic bids to regionals.  The remaining 34 spots were awarded to schools as at-large invitees.

Bids by conference

Tournament notes 
 Birmingham–Southern, UC Irvine, College of Charleston, Jacksonville St., St. Bonaventure, Stony Brook, Texas Southern, and Youngstown St. were making their first NCAA tournament appearance.

College World Series notes 
Four of the eight teams are members of the Southeastern Conference; the conference tied its own record set in 1997 when Alabama, Auburn, LSU, and Mississippi State participated.
South Carolina and Texas made their third consecutive appearance in Omaha; the Longhorns defeated the Gamecocks in the 2002 national championship game, the last year the bracket winners played one winner-take-all game.
Cal State Fullerton, Miami, and LSU were also included in last year's CWS field.
Last year's champion and runner-up, Rice and Stanford, did not make it past Sub-Regional play; 2004 was the first time in six years that Stanford has not made it to Omaha.
The 2004 participants combined for 110 CWS appearances and 21 Championships; only Arkansas and South Carolina had yet to win a title.
The 2004 participants had won 10 of the last 14 national titles.

CWS records tied or broken
Most appearances in one CWS by a pitcher: five by Texas' J. B. Cox, the 10th time that has happened.
Most CWS games finished by a relief pitcher in a career: nine by Texas' Huston Street (2001–03), tying the mark set by Miami's Rick Raether (1985–86).
Largest single-game attendance: 28,216 on June 23 for the South Carolina-Cal State Fullerton game.

National seeds
Bold indicates CWS participant.

Texas
South Carolina
Miami (FL)

Arkansas

Regionals and super regionals

Bold indicates winner.

Austin Super Regional

Columbia Super Regional

Coral Gables Super Regional

Atlanta Super Regional

Long Beach Super Regional 
Hosted by Long Beach State at Blair Field.

Baton Rouge Super Regional

Fullerton Super Regional

Fayetteville Super Regional

College World Series

Participants

Bracket

Championship series

Saturday 6/26 Game #1

Sunday 6/27 Game #2

All-Tournament Team

The following players were members of the College World Series All-Tournament Team.

References 

 

NCAA Division I Baseball Championship
NCAA Division I Baseball Championship
Baseball in Austin, Texas
Baseball in Houston